Part XIV is a compilation of laws pertaining to the constitution of India as a country and the union of states that it is made of. This part of the constitution consists of Articles on Services Under the Union and the States.

Chapter I - Services

Articles 308 – 314 
Contain provisions with regard to All India Services, Central services and state services. Article 308 makes it clear that these provisions do not apply to the state of Jammu and Kashmir.

Chapter II - Public Service Commissions

Articles 315 – 323
On the Public service commissions of India:

Part XIVA
Part XIVA consists of Articles on Tribunals

Articles 323A - 323B

References

Sources

Part 14